The Upper Newport Bay (known locally as "The Back Bay") is a large coastal wetland (an estuary) in Newport Beach, Southern California  and a major stopover for birds on the Pacific Flyway. Dozens of species, including endangered ones, can be observed here. Upper Newport Bay Nature Preserve and Ecological Reserve represent approximately 1,000 acres (4 km2) of open space. The Upper Newport Bay was purchased by the state in 1975 for its Fish and Wildlife Department's Ecological Reserve System. In 1985 the upper west bluffs and lands surrounding the bay became part of an Orange County regional park, which offers outdoor activities such as bird-watching, jogging, bicycling, hiking, and kayaking.  The Peter and Mary Muth Interpretive Center, located at 2301 University Drive, is open to the public Tuesday through Sunday from 10:00 AM to 4:00 PM.  An organization known as the Newport Bay Conservancy (NBC) provides volunteers to answer visitors' questions and guide them through the various activities.  

The bay is recognized for protection by the California Bays and Estuaries Policy.

The main tributary of the Upper Newport Bay is San Diego Creek, which flows past the San Joaquin Wildlife Sanctuary before entering the bay. The bay is connected to the Pacific Ocean through the lower Newport Bay, the harbor of Newport Beach.

References

External links

Archival collections
Guide to the Frank and Frances Robinson Files on Upper Newport Bay Preservation. Special Collections and Archives, The UC Irvine Libraries, Irvine, California.
Guide to the Collection on Upper Newport Bay, circa 1949-1997. Special Collections and Archives, The UC Irvine Libraries, Irvine, California.
Guide to the Ray E. Williams Files on Newport Bay Environmental Issues. Special Collections and Archives, The UC Irvine Libraries, Irvine, California.

Other
 OCParks.com: Upper Newport Bay
 Newport Bay Conservancy
 Backbay Science Center
 Coastal Commission
 Upper Newport Bay Ecological Reserve - California Department of Fish and Wildlife

Newport Beach, California
Landforms of Orange County, California
Watersheds of California
Estuaries of California